Ezzahabad (also Romanized as ‘Ezzahābād; also known as ‘Ezzābād) is a village in Banesh Rural District, Beyza District, Sepidan County, Fars Province, Iran. At the 2006 census, its population was 316, in 72 families.

References 

Populated places in Beyza County